Lon of Lone Mountain is a 1915 American short silent drama film directed by Joe De Grasse, witten by Ida May Park, and featuring Lon Chaney and Arthur Shirley.The film is now presumed lost. A still exists showing Lon Chaney in the role of "Lon", the mountain man.

Plot
Melissa lives in a backward mountain community with her stern stepfather, Dan Hadley. Her sweetheart, Lon Moore, is horrified by the beatings Melissa receives from her stepdad. Meanwhile, a handsome new schoolmaster has arrived in the community, and all of the women fawn over him. The schoolteacher takes an interest in Melissa, protects her from abuse and finally induces her to enroll as a student at the school. Lon becomes wildly jealous, and convinces the other men that the schoolteacher is out to steal all of their women. Lon soon realizes however that the teacher actually has good intentions, and when the townspeople make an attempt to kill him, Lon shields the man and is injured himself. Melissa realizes what a good man Lon is, and she decides to go back to him.

Cast
 Marcia Moore as Melissa
 George Burrell as Dan Hadley (Melissa's stepfather)
 Lon Chaney as Lon Moore, a mountain man
 Arthur Shirley as the schoolmaster

Reception
"An unusually pleasing mountain story by Ida May Park. The types are good and the atmosphere unusually pleasing. A good release." --- Moving Picture World

"Lon Chaney endows this backwoods love story with a strong character study. Joe De Grasse produced it so its artistic qualities can best be imagined. It surely is a worthy one-reeler in every one of its major respects." ---Motion Picture News

References

External links

1915 films
1915 drama films
1915 short films
Silent American drama films
American silent short films
American black-and-white films
Films directed by Joseph De Grasse
Lost American films
Universal Pictures short films
1915 lost films
1910s American films